Richard Edward Falkner (born 13 August 1982) is an English cricketer.  Falkner is a right-handed batsman who plays occasionally as a wicketkeeper.  He was born at Northampton, Northamptonshire.

Falkner represented the Northamptonshire Cricket Board in List A cricket.  His debut List A match came against Wiltshire in the 1999 NatWest Trophy.  From 1999 to 2001, he represented the Board in 5 List A matches, the last of which came against the Leicestershire Cricket Board in the 1st round of the 2002 Cheltenham & Gloucester Trophy which was played in 2001.  In his 4 List A matches, he scored 122 runs at a batting average of 40.66, with a high score of 46.  Behind the stumps he took a single catch and made 2 stumpings.

He currently plays club cricket for Horton House Cricket Club.

References

External links
Richard Falkner at Cricinfo
Richard Falkner at CricketArchive

1982 births
Living people
Cricketers from Northampton
English cricketers
Northamptonshire Cricket Board cricketers